Welspun Global Brands Limited,  formerly Welspun Retail Limited is an Indian household goods retailer based in Mumbai, Maharashtra. It is a part of the  Welspun Group.

It was incorporated in 2004 to promote Welspun products. It retails its products through its two brands: Welhome and Home Décor. It main products includes home furnishing such as bed, bath, kitchen, dining and living items. It has more than 200 stores and 60 Spaces stores across 120 cities with plans to open another 900 stores with over a million sq.ft. of retail space in India in over 235 cities and towns.

References

External links
Welspun Retail to invest Rs 150 cr on expansion
Welspun Retail to invest Rs 150 crore on store expansion
Welspun looking at retail spin-off, float

Companies based in Mumbai
Retail companies of India
Retail companies established in 2006
Clothing retailers of India
Welspun Group
Indian companies established in 2006
2006 establishments in Maharashtra